The Race of a Thousand Camels is the debut album by the English rock band Bôa released on 1 July 1998. During the recording of this album the band consisted of Alex Caird, Ben Henderson, Jasmine Rodgers, Steve Rodgers, Lee Sullivan and Paul Turrell.

The third track, "Duvet", became popular after being used as the opening theme song to the anime series Serial Experiments Lain.

Track listing
All tracks written by Bôa.
"Fool" – 5:06
"Twilight" – 3:48
"Duvet" – 3:23
"Rain" – 3:55
"Elephant" – 3:54
"Scoring" – 3:49
"Deeply" – 4:35
"One Day" – 2:41
"Welcome" – 5:06
"For Jasmine" – 5:18
"Anna María" – 4:03

Personnel
 Alex Caird - bass guitars
 Ben Henderson - electric and acoustic guitars, saxophone, percussion
 Jasmine Rodgers - lead vocals, acoustic guitars, percussion
 Steve Rodgers - electric and acoustic guitars, vocals
 Lee Sullivan - drums, percussion, keyboards
 Paul Turrell - keyboards, strings arrangements, percussion, electric guitars

1998 debut albums
Bôa albums